The 2008–09 season was Kilmarnock's tenth consecutive season in the Scottish Premier League, having competed in it since its inauguration in 1998–99. Kilmarnock also competed in the Scottish Cup and the League Cup.

Summary

Season
Kilmarnock finished eighth in the Scottish Premier League with 44 points. They reached the Quarter-Final of the League Cup, losing to Celtic and the fourth round of the Scottish Cup, losing to Inverness.

Results and fixtures

Scottish Premier League

Scottish Cup

Scottish League Cup

Player statistics

|}

Final league table

Division summary

Transfers

Players in

Players out

References

External links
 Kilmarnock 2008–09 at Soccerbase.com (select relevant season from dropdown list)

Kilmarnock